is a passenger railway station located in the city of Chichibu, Saitama, Japan, operated by the private railway operator Chichibu Railway.

Lines
It is also served by through services to and from the Seibu Chichibu Line.

Station layout
The station is staffed and consists of an island platform serving two tracks.

Platforms

Adjacent stations

History
Bushū-Hino Station opened on 15 March 1930.

Passenger statistics
In fiscal 2018, the station was used by an average of 201 passengers daily.

Surrounding area
 Arakawa River
 
 Chichibu Arakawa Junior High School

References

External links

 Bushū-Hino Station information (Saitama Prefectural Government) 
 Bushū-Hino Station timetable 

Railway stations in Japan opened in 1930
Railway stations in Saitama Prefecture
Chichibu, Saitama